Pershing Square Holdings is a large British investment trust dedicated to long-term investments in North American companies. Established in 2012, the company is a constituent of the FTSE 100 Index. The chairman is Anne Farlow. The fund is managed by Bill Ackman of Pershing Square Capital Management.

Pershing Square Holdings, a FTSE company, tracks the performance of Pershing Square Capital Management, an American fund.

References

External links
  Official site

Financial services companies established in 2012
Investment trusts of the United Kingdom
Companies listed on the London Stock Exchange